Miguel Ángel Carbonell (born in Resistencia (Chaco), Argentina) is a former Argentine footballer who played for clubs of Argentina and Chile.

Teams
  San Telmo 1993–1994
  Arturo Fernández Vial 1994
  Ñublense 1995
  San Telmo 1995–1997
  Cobreloa 1997
  San Telmo 1998–2005

References
 Profile at BDFA 

Living people
Argentine footballers
Argentine expatriate footballers
San Telmo footballers
C.D. Arturo Fernández Vial footballers
Ñublense footballers
Cobreloa footballers
Primera B de Chile players
Chilean Primera División players
Expatriate footballers in Chile
Association footballers not categorized by position
Year of birth missing (living people)
Sportspeople from Chaco Province
People from Resistencia, Chaco